Project Valhalla is an experimental OpenJDK project to develop major new language features for Java 10 and beyond. The project was announced in July 2014 and is an experimental effort by Oracle, led by engineer Brian Goetz.

Planned features

Valhalla is incubating Java language features and enhancements in these areas:
 Value Types; highly-efficient small 'objects' without inheritance.
 Generic Specialization; List<int> for example.
 Reified Generics; retaining actual type at runtime.
 improved 'volatile' support.

These features will require both syntax and VM-level changes.

Project activity

The project is organized on the OpenJDK 'Project Valhalla' mailing list. Project Valhalla has begun in the experimental stages, with an inaugural announcement & early draft initial proposals.

Published as of January 2022:
 Project Valhalla announcement
 'Value Types' initial proposal
 'Generic Specialization' initial proposal
 State of Valhalla,  Section 1: The Road to Valhalla
 State of Valhalla,  Section 2: Language Model
 State of Valhalla, Section 3: JVM Model
 State of Valhalla, Section 4: Translation scheme

Experimental OpenJDK prototypes can also be built from the Mercurial repositories. These are starting to incorporate many specialization features. Note that these are Gnu Make/ C++ sources, and building the OpenJDK requires technical expertise. See OpenJDK build instructions for details.
 Project Valhalla OpenJDK source repositories

Project Components
The project is organized into several JEPs (JDK Enhancement Proposals):
 JEP Draft: Value Objects (Preview)
 JEP 401: Primitive Classes (Preview)
 JEP 402: Classes for the Basic Primitives (Preview)
 JEP draft: Universal Generics (Preview)

Value Classes 
Value classes are reference types, in the same way as all existing Java classes. However, they give up the ability to have identity. This means that the  operator compares instance of the value class by equality of their components, instead of by identity. Additionally, synchronizing on instances of value classes will fail.

Value classes still support , since they are reference types. The Java Virtual Machine is expected to be able to take advantage of the additional constraints of value classes to eliminate heap allocation of value types in the vast majority of cases. However, storing instances of value classes into a field or upcasting them to an interface will still require an allocation.

Primitive Classes 
Primitive Classes are subject to all the constraints of value classes, but are not reference types. This means they give up the ability to support . Instead, their default values are the zero value for each of the component types ( for numerical types,  for booleans,  for reference types, and the zero value for nested primitive classes.

All primitive classes are stored "inline", that is, without requiring a heap allocation. Arrays of primitive classes will not require a pointer indirection from the array to the heap. Where needed, conversions will be inserted to "box" the primitive class into a value class version of itself and vice versa.

Classes for the Basic Primitives 
This JEP is meant to express the classical primitive types of the Java Virtual Machine (byte, char, short, int, long, boolean, float, double) as Primitive Classes.

Traditionally, the eight primitive types are treated separately from all other types. Providing primitive class declarations from them removes much of this special-casing, leading to a more elegant and easy to understand type system.

Technical benefits and implications

Memory access performance and the efficiency of 'boxed' value access are a major area to be addressed by these features. 'Value Type' features and 'Generic specialization' (when applied to lists or collections) reduce memory usage, but more importantly avoid pointer indirection which typically causes a cache miss.

Instead of a list or array of object references, pointing to data values scattered throughout memory, Project Valhalla enhancements will enable list or array values to potentially be laid out linearly—without indirection—as a consecutive block of memory.

Value Types are envisaged as "Codes like a class, works like an int!" Synchronization and inheritance would be excluded for Value Types. These would no longer require object identity and associated memory/ pointer overheads, though would be able to assume a 'boxed' form for compatibility.

See also
 Generics in Java
 Generic programming
 Value type

References

External links 
 Java incubator to explore technologies for Java 10 and beyond - JavaWorld
 Value Types & List<int> coming for Java 10? - LiterateJava.com
 OpenJDK - Project Valhalla

Java (programming language)